More to This Life is the third album released by American contemporary Christian music singer and songwriter Steven Curtis Chapman. It was released in 1989 by Sparrow Records.

Track listing
All songs written by Steven Curtis  Chapman, except where noted.
 "More to This Life"  – 5:15
 "Love You With My Life" – 3:23
 "Waiting for Lightning"  – 3:44
 "Living for the Moment" – 4:52
 "I Will Be Here" – 4:28
 "Who Makes the Rules"  – 3:31
 "Treasure Island" – 4:52
 "Way Beyond the Blue" – 5:45
 "In This Little Room"  – 3:37
 "More Than Words" – 4:33
 "Out in the Highways"  – 4:59 (This version is not included in the audio cassette version)

Personnel 
 Steven Curtis Chapman – lead vocals, backing vocals, acoustic guitar, electric guitar
 Phil Naish – keyboards
 Jon Goin – acoustic guitar, electric guitar
 Don Potter – slide acoustic guitar (6)
 Mark O'Connor – violin (6), mandolin (10)
 Jackie Street – bass
 Mark Hammond – drums
  Don Wyrtzen – string arrangements and conductor (3, 5, 8)
 Carl Gorodetzsky – string leader (3, 5, 8)
 The Nashville String Machine – strings (3, 5, 8)
 Herb Chapman – backing vocals
 Chris Harris – backing vocals
 Mark Heimermann – backing vocals
 Chris Rodriguez – backing vocals

Production 
 Phil Naish – producer
 Jeff Balding – recording, mixing
 Ronnie Brookshire – additional engineer
 Steve Bishir – assistant engineer
 Barry Ray Dixon – assistant engineer
 Howard Levy – assistant engineer
 Carry Summers – assistant engineer
 Denny Purcell – mastering
 Cindy Wilt – production manager
 Mark Tucker – photography
 Brenda Whitehill – design
 Barbara Hearn – art direction

Studios
 OmniSound, Nashville, Tennessee
 Quad Studios, Nashville, Tennessee
 The Pond, Franklin, Tennessee
 Studio 55, Los Angeles, California
 Georgetown Masters, Nashville, Tennessee – mastering location

References

Steven Curtis Chapman albums
1989 albums